Mba, also known as (Ki)Manga or (Ki)Mbanga, is a Ubangian language spoken in the Banjwade area of Banalia Territory, Tshopo Province, DR Congo (Ethnologue, 22nd ed.).

References

Mba languages
Languages of the Democratic Republic of the Congo